Here follows a list of notable people associated with Centre College in Danville, Kentucky.

Notable graduates

Law
John Christian Bullitt, 1849: attorney in Philadelphia, drafted the city's charter and founded the law firm of Drinker, Biddle & Reath
John Marshall Harlan, 1850: Supreme Court associate justice (1877–1911), cast the lone dissenting vote in Plessy v. Ferguson
Pierce Lively, 1943: federal judge on the United States Court of Appeals for the Sixth Circuit (1972–2016)
Andrew Phelps McCormick, 1854: federal judge on the United States Court of Appeals for the Fifth Circuit (1892–1916)
Fred M. Vinson, 1909, Law 1911: chief justice of the United States (1946–53), secretary of the treasury (1945–46), member of the U.S. House of Representatives from KY–08 and KY–09 (1933–43)

Government
George Madison Adams: member of the U.S. House of Representatives from KY–08 and KY–09 (1867–75), secretary of state of Kentucky (1887–91)
Joshua Fry Bell, 1828: member in the U.S. House of Representatives from KY–04 (1845–47; first Centre alumnus to serve in Congress), secretary of state of Kentucky (1849–50)
John C. Breckinridge, 1838: U.S. vice president (1857–61); Confederate secretary of war (1865); U.S. senator from Kentucky (1861)
John Y. Brown, Sr., 1921: member of the U.S. House of Representatives from KY–AL (1933–35)
Jacqueline Coleman, 2004: lieutenant governor of Kentucky (2019–present) 
John Sherman Cooper, 1922: U.S. ambassador to East Germany (1974–76), U.S. senator from Kentucky (1946–49, 1952–55, 1956–73), U.S. ambassador to India (1955–56)
Michael W. Jackson, 1985:Alabama District Attorney (2005 - present)
Claude Matthews, 1867: governor of Indiana (1893–97), secretary of state of Indiana (1891–93)
Austin Peay, 1895: governor of Tennessee (1923–27)
Augustus Stanley, 1889: U.S. senator from Kentucky (1919–25), governor of Kentucky (1915–19), member of the U.S. House of Representatives from KY–02 (1903–15)
Adlai Stevenson I, 1859: U.S. vice president (1893–97), member of the U.S. House of Representatives from IL–13 (1875–77, 1879–81)
John T. Stuart, 1826: member of the U.S. House of Representatives from IL–03 (1839–43) and IL–08 (1863–65), lawyer, law partner of Abraham Lincoln
Yi Kuu, Prince Imperial Hoeun, 1952: Prince Imperial of Korea, grandson of Emperor Gojong
Joseph Holt, 1824: U.S. postmaster general, U.S. secretary of war and Judge Advocate General of the United States Army; leading judge in the trials of the Abraham Lincoln assassination
Thomas H. Taylor, Confederate general (1861–65), Louisville chief of police (1881–92)
George Graham Vest, U.S. senator from Missouri (1879–1903), Confederate senator from Missouri (1865), member of the Confederate House of Representatives from MO–05; best known for supposedly coining the phrases "man's best friend" and "history is written by the victors."

Arts
George Ella Lyon, 1971: former Kentucky Poet Laureate
Stephen Rolfe Powell, 1974: internationally acclaimed glass blower and art professor
Tony Crunk, 1978: winner, Yale Younger Poets prize

Athletics
Gene Bedford: second baseman for the Cleveland Indians and defensive end for the Rochester Jeffersons
Herb Covington, 1924: played football, basketball, and baseball for Centre, named to the all-time Centre football team in 1935
E.A. Diddle, 1920: legendary basketball coach of Western Kentucky University, member of the Naismith Memorial Basketball Hall of Fame
Jordan Gay, 2013: punter and kickoff specialist for the Buffalo Bills
Cawood Ledford, 1949: voice of the University of Kentucky Wildcats for 30 years
Alvin Nugent "Bo" McMillin, 1922: three-time All-American quarterback; member of the College Football Hall of Fame; head football coach of Indiana University, Detroit Lions, and Philadelphia Eagles
Sully Montgomery, 1920: tackle for the Chicago Cardinals; boxer
Tom Moran: blocking back for the New York Giants
Homer Rice, football coach
Red Roberts, 1922: NFL player; head football coach of Waynesburg University
Lou Smyth, 1919: three-time NFL champion with the Canton Bulldogs
John Tanner, 1921: NFL wingback with the Toledo Maroons, Cleveland Indians, and Cleveland Bulldogs
Ken Willis, 1986 (transferred after one year): kicker for the Dallas Cowboys

Academia
Raymond Burse, 1973: Rhodes Scholar; General Counsel for General Electric; former president of Kentucky State University; the first African-American to compete in the Oxford v. Cambridge rugby match

Business
Isaac Tigrett, 1970: founder of the Hard Rock Cafe and the House of Blues

Other
Rev. Samuel D. Burchard, 1837: clergyman whose "Rum, Romanism and rebellion" speech may have cost James G. Blaine the 1884 presidential election
Charles Carpenter (Lt. Col.): highly decorated Second World War artillery observation pilot nicknamed "Bazooka Charlie"; destroyed several German armored vehicles in his bazooka-equipped L-4 Grasshopper light observation aircraft, christened "Rosie the Rocketer"
George W. Harkins: attorney and chief of the Choctaw tribe during Indian removal.
Lewis Craig Humphrey, 1896: editor of the Centre College newspaper The Cento; chief editor of the Louisville Evening Post and the Louisville Herald
E Patrick Doyle was attending Centre College in 1848 when he helped lead the largest slave uprising in Kentucky, ending with Doyle's capture and imprisonment.

Faculty and staff
J. Proctor Knott: law professor at Centre; 29th governor of Kentucky
Sara W. Mahan: 64th Secretary of State of Kentucky, served as college librarian from 1920–21
Ephraim McDowell: member of the Board of Trustees and namesake of the Ephraim McDowell Regional Medical Center

Presidents of the College

References

Centre College people
 
Centre College